is a Japanese football player currently playing as a defender for Albirex Niigata (S).

Playing career
Takahashi was born in Tokyo on July 11, 2000. He joined J1 League club FC Tokyo from youth team in 2018.

Career statistics

Club
.

Notes

References

External links

2000 births
Living people
Association football people from Tokyo
Toyo University alumni
Japanese footballers
Association football defenders
J3 League players
FC Tokyo players
FC Tokyo U-23 players
Albirex Niigata Singapore FC players
Japanese expatriate footballers
Japanese expatriate sportspeople in Singapore
Expatriate footballers in Singapore